Zemina is a surname. Notable people with the surname include:

Abba bar Zemina, Jewish scholar of the fourth century
Paige Zemina (born 1968), American swimmer

See also
Zeina
Zemin